Craigmark Burntonians Football Club are a Scottish football club, based in the town of Dalmellington, Ayrshire. Nicknamed The Mark, they were formed in 1946 and play at Station Park.

Craigmark Burntonians F.C. are currently managed by Ryan Caddis.

Caddis was appointed on 21 May 2021 will take charge for season 2021–22 at Station Park.

Honours
Ayrshire Second Division winners: 1982–83
Ayrshire League (Kerr & Smith) Cup: 1963–64, 1964–65, 1980–81
Ayrshire District (Irvine Times) Cup: 1963–64
Cumnock & Doon Cup: 1989–90
Ayrshire Super Cup: 1989–90

References

External links

 
Football clubs in Scotland
Scottish Junior Football Association clubs
Association football clubs established in 1946
Football in East Ayrshire
1946 establishments in Scotland
West of Scotland Football League teams
Dalmellington